John Cheyne may refer to:

 Sir John Cheyne (speaker) (died 1414), Speaker of the House of Commons
 John Cheyne (MP for Buckinghamshire) (died c.1447), MP for Buckinghamshire, 1413, 1415, 1425 and 1427
 Sir John Cheyne (builder of Chenies Manor) in Chenies, Buckinghamshire c.1460
 Sir John Cheyne (died 1468), c.1390–1468), MP for Buckinghamshire, 1421 to 1445
 John Cheyne (died 1585), Member of Parliament for Chipping Wycombe
 John Cheyne (by 1510–67), Member of Parliament for Dover, Winchelsea and Berkshire
 John Cheyne, Baron Cheyne (c. 1442–1499), Master of the Horse to Edward IV of England
 John Cheyne (physician) (1777–1836), British physician, surgeon and author
 Sir John Cheyne (advocate) of Tangwick QC KC LLD (1841–1907), Scottish advocate

See also
John Cheney (disambiguation)
John Chaney (disambiguation)